Dual representation theory (DRT) is a psychological theory of post-traumatic stress disorder (PTSD) developed by Chris Brewin, Tim Dalgleish, and Stephen Joseph in 1996. This theory proposes that certain symptoms of PTSD - such as nightmares, flashbacks, and emotional disturbance - may be attributed to memory processes that occur after exposure to a traumatic event. DRT proposes the existence of two separate memory systems that run in parallel during memory formation: the verbally accessible memory system (VAM) and situationally accessible memory system (SAM). The VAM system contains information that was consciously processed and thus can be voluntarily recalled or described. In contrast, the SAM system contains unconsciously processed sensory information that cannot be voluntarily recalled. This theory suggests that the VAM system is impaired during a traumatic event because conscious attention is narrowly drawn to threat-related information. Therefore, memory of the trauma is heavily focused on fear, which affects information processing. This gives rise to PTSD symptoms such as trauma-related cognitions, appraisals, and emotions. The SAM system captures vivid sensory information during the traumatic event, which is automatically recalled through exposure to trauma-related triggers. This system is thought to be responsible for the presence of flashbacks and nightmares in PTSD symptomatology.

Background 
Prior to the development of DRT, existing theories of PTSD fell into two camps: social-cognitive theories and information-processing theories. Social-cognitive theories (e.g. Horowitz's stress-response theory, Janoff-Bulman's shattered assumptions theory) focused on the affected individual's assumptions about the world and the emotional and cognitive impact of the trauma on these assumptions. Information-processing theories (e.g. Foa's emotional processing theory  ) focus more on attentional biases to threat-related stimuli and how representation and processing of this information may generate intrusive re-experiencing symptoms of PTSD. Brewin and colleagues noted that each of the two theory camps focused on characteristics of PTSD that were distinct and may be explained by different underlying processes. They concluded that existing theories did not adequately capture the full range of PTSD symptoms. They also drew from research on flashbulb memories, which suggested that a special cognitive mechanism may be involved in the encoding of highly emotionally charged memories.

Clinical implications 
According to DRT, the symptoms of PTSD arise when memory processes interact with other pre-trauma, peri-trauma, and post-trauma factors. Some of these factors may include severity and duration of the trauma, existing schemas about the self and the world, social support, and the presence of guilt or shame. Based on these interactions, Brewin and colleagues proposed that there are three possible outcomes of post-traumatic emotional processing: completion/integration, chronic emotional processing, and premature inhibition of processing.

Completion/integration 
Completion/integration occurs when traumatic memories have been consciously processed and integrated with the individual’s existing memories and cognitive schemas. This outcome represents recovery from the effects of trauma exposure and minimal post-traumatic symptoms. For completion/integration to occur, there must be repeated exposure to the traumatic memory and associated stimuli to allow habituation to occur. Through habituation, the traumatized individual is increasingly able to regulate emotion when exposed to the traumatic memory. This is thought to occur as the individual is repeatedly exposed to SAMs and integrates sensory information about the trauma into conscious memory. When this occurs alongside conscious efforts to integrate the trauma with the individual’s existing schemas, successful emotional processing of the trauma is thought to occur.  DRT predicts that completion/integration would be characterized by a lack of attentional bias towards trauma-related stimuli.

Chronic emotional processing 
Chronic emotional processing may occur as a result of severe or ongoing trauma, lack of social support, or inability to incorporate the traumatic experience into existing schemas. Chronic emotional processing occurs when conscious and unconscious memory processes related to the trauma are not successfully integrated. VAMs and SAMs of the trauma may be chronically processed, meaning that the individual is unable to inhibit the intrusion of SAMs into consciousness and there is little or no shift in existing schemas about the self and the world. This results in intrusive symptoms stemming from SAMs and maladaptive preoccupation with the trauma. Attention and memory biases toward trauma-related stimuli are likely to be present. Furthermore, DRT proposes that mood symptoms such as depression and anxiety may develop as a byproduct of chronic emotional processing.

Premature inhibition of processing 
Failure to integrate the trauma with existing memories and schemas may occur due to inhibited emotional processing of traumatic memory. This occurs when an individual avoids internal (e.g. thoughts, emotions, sensations) and external (e.g. people, places, situations) stimuli that activate trauma-related SAMs and VAMs. In premature inhibition, avoidance allows the individual to inhibit the intrusion of SAMs into consciousness; this hinders the integration of SAMs into the VAM system. The individual remains vulnerable to emotional distress when trauma-related stimuli are encountered. Attentional bias toward trauma-related stimuli is likely present and may be coupled with impaired memory of the trauma.

Empirical evidence

Support 
Studies have examined the effect of performing visuospatial tasks during memory consolidation of distressing stimuli. These studies have found that playing the game TETRIS after exposure to distressing stimuli reduces the number of intrusive thoughts. This may mean visuospatial tasks compete with sensory processing of distressing stimuli, therefore impairing this type of processing results in fewer intrusive experiences. Research into the human experience of natural disaster and crisis recognises that there is a large emotional component that requires addressing in order to prevent post traumatic mental health difficulties. In order to process this, an individual needs to make space to reflect on the experience and engage with the emotions connected with this experience. Through this process, growth in resilience and psychological flexibility occurs. In addition, when this process is supported collectively, increases in solidarity and community engagement are found. Conversely, when individuals do not process their emotional experiences, they are less engaged with their community, more emotionally reactive, and more likely to experience depressive symptoms.

Criticism 
Some studies have found that providing contextual information before exposure to distressing stimuli actually increases the frequency of intrusive thoughts. This appears to contradict DRT which posits that when contextual information (in VAM) and sensory information (in SAM) integrate, this results in decreased intrusive symptoms. DRT has also been criticized for a lack of explanation about how the VAM and SAM systems communicate with each other.

References

Post-traumatic stress disorder
Memory disorders
Cognitive modeling